Iraj (also Romanized as Īraj) is a village in Ruin Rural District, in the Central District of Esfarayen County, North Khorasan Province, Iran. At the 2006 census, its population was 1,506, in 366 families.

References 

Populated places in Esfarayen County